The 1930 Minneapolis Red Jackets season was their sixth and final season in the league. The team improved on their previous output of 1–9, losing only seven games.

Schedule

Standings

References

Minneapolis Red Jackets seasons
Minneapolis Red Jackets
Marines